Jakub Tyc (born February 13, 1992, in Warsaw, Poland) is a Polish figure skater. He started skating at age seven and competed initially in single skating. After switching to pairs, he skated with Anastasia Levshina and Anna Siedlecka. His current partner is Marcelina Lech.

Programs
(with Levshina)

Competitive highlights

With Lech

With Levshina

Singles career

References

External links 
 
 
 Anastasia Levshina / Jakub Tyc at Tracings.net
 Anastasia Levshina / Jakub Tyc at Figure Skating Online
 Jakub Tyc at Tracings.net

Polish male pair skaters
Polish male single skaters
1992 births
Living people
Figure skaters from Warsaw